Vester Marshall  (born December 22, 1948) was a retired professional basketball small forward who played one season in the National Basketball Association (NBA) as a member of the Seattle SuperSonics during the 1973–74 season.

Biography
Marshall was born on December 22, 1948. He became a standout basketball player for the Druid High School in Tuscaloosa, Alabama where he led his team to the state championship his first year. Marshall participated in the Selma to Montgomery marches along with Martin Luther King Jr. and other leaders of the Civil Rights Movement. He attended University of Oklahoma where his teammates included Garfield Heard and Clifford Ray. Coach John MacLeod removed Marshall from the basketball team for leading a racially motivated protest. 

After graduating, he went to Mexico to play professional basketball. In December 1973 the Seattle SuperSonics waived Jim McDaniels and replaced him on the roster by Marshall who signed for the league minimum US$25,000 ($ adjusted for inflation). He practices yoga and has been an instructor in Seattle, Washington. He was an assistant coach at Bellevue Community College for two years (1978–79). Marshall has been an ordained minister since 2006. In 2008, the Seattle Post-Intelligencer wrote an article on Marshall where it stated he lived in a studio apartment in Seattle working as a street minister, herbalist and artist.

References

External links

1948 births
Living people
American expatriate basketball people in Mexico
American men's basketball players
Basketball players from Alabama
Junior college men's basketball coaches in the United States
Oklahoma Sooners men's basketball players
Seattle SuperSonics players
Small forwards
Undrafted National Basketball Association players